Bashistha Narain Singh, is a politician from Janata Dal (United). He is a Member of the Parliament of India representing Bihar in the Rajya Sabha, the upper house of the Indian Parliament. He had served as Bihar state President of Janata Dal (United), the ruling party of the state. In January 2021, he was succeeded by Umesh Kushwaha to the post of Bihar state chief of JD (U). Previously, he was a member of  Samata Party (Uday Mandal is current National President) and was the President Bihar Samata Party from 1995 to 1998.

Political career 

Singh was imprisoned several times during the Bihar movement. During Indian Emergency, he was imprisoned for nineteen months. In 1977, He was administered the oath at Shaheed Smarak, Patna to the members of the newly constituted Bihar Vidhan Sabha who were associated with the J.P. Movement. He was General Secretary of Bihar Janata Party from 1980 to 1985. He was a member of the Executive Committee Bihar Janata Dal from 1989 to 1990 then was the Member of Parliamentary Board, Janata Dal from 1990 to 1994. In 1994, he joined Samta Party  formed by George Fernandes and Nitish Kumar and was the President Bihar Samata Party from 1995 to 1998.

References

External links
 Profile on Rajya Sabha website

Samata Party politicians
Living people
1947 births
People from Buxar district
Rajya Sabha members from Bihar
Janata Dal (United) politicians
Janata Party politicians